Mišače is a small settlement on the road from Globoko to Otoče in the Municipality of Radovljica in the Upper Carniola region of Slovenia.

Name
Mišače was attested in written sources as Meyssach in 1368 and as Mischacz in 1498.

References

External links
Mišače at Geopedia
Monography of Mišače, with photo album

Populated places in the Municipality of Radovljica